Connor McLennan (born 5 October 1999) is a Scottish professional footballer who plays as a forward for St Johnstone, on loan from Aberdeen.

Club career
McLennan was born and raised in Peterhead, Aberdeenshire, and attended Peterhead Academy. He joined Aberdeen's youth system at the age of eight, and turned professional aged 16 in December 2015. He made his debut as a substitute away to St Johnstone on 22 April 2016.

On 16 December 2016, McLennan joined Scottish League One side Brechin City on a one-month emergency loan deal, playing 3 times and scoring 1 goal. He returned to Brechin for a second loan spell on 30 August 2017.

Having scored in the final of the 2017–18 Scottish Youth Cup and made further appearances in the first team including as a substitute in the 2018 Scottish League Cup Final, In December 2018, he signed a new contract with Aberdeen until 2021. In January 2021, he signed a new contract until 2023.

He moved on loan to St Johnstone on 1 September 2022.

International career
McLennan represented Scotland at under-16, under-17 and under-20 levels,  including at the 2016 UEFA European Under-17 Championship in Azerbaijan. He then played for the under-21 team, and scored both goals in a 2–1 win against Croatia in September 2019.

Career statistics

References

1999 births
Living people
Scottish footballers
Footballers from Aberdeenshire
People from Peterhead
People educated at Peterhead Academy
Aberdeen F.C. players
Brechin City F.C. players
St Johnstone F.C. players
Scottish Professional Football League players
Association football forwards
Scotland youth international footballers
Scotland under-21 international footballers